The 1987–88 Illinois Fighting Illini men's basketball team represented the University of Illinois.

Regular season
The 1987–88 season brought Lou Henson his 500th career victory and laid the foundation for what would be an incredible history making season in 1988–1989.

Roster

Source

Schedule
												
Source																
												

|-
!colspan=12 style="background:#DF4E38; color:white;"| Non-Conference regular season

	

|-
!colspan=9 style="background:#DF4E38; color:#FFFFFF;"|Big Ten regular season	

|-
!colspan=9 style="text-align: center; background:#DF4E38"|NCAA Tournament

|-

Player stats

Awards and honors
Kendall Gill
Fighting Illini All-Century team (2005)
Nick Anderson
Team Co-Most Valuable Player 
Fighting Illini All-Century team (2005)
Kenny Battle
Team Co-Most Valuable Player 
Fighting Illini All-Century team (2005)

Team players drafted into the NBA

Rankings

References

Illinois Fighting Illini
Illinois
Illinois Fighting Illini men's basketball seasons
1987 in sports in Illinois
1988 in sports in Illinois